Jason Cotton (born February 7, 1995) is an American former professional ice hockey center who played in the American Hockey League (AHL) with the Chicago Wolves.

Early life
Cotton was born on February 7, 1995, in Parker, Texas to parents Peggy and Steve. He grew up the middle of three siblings and played hockey with his younger brother David.

Playing career

Amateur
Cotton finished the 2011–12 season with 39 points in 40 games for the Thunderbirds U16 team and planned on joining the Tri-City Storm the following season. On July 12, 2012, Cotton announced his commitment to play NCAA Division I college ice hockey with the Northeastern Huskies men's ice hockey team. After playing one season with the Storm, recording six points in 45 games, his playing rights were acquired by the West Kelowna Warriors in the British Columbia Hockey League (BCHL). He made his BCHL debut on September 20 where he scored two goals in a 5–3 win over the Salmon Arm Silverbacks. As a result of his play with the Warriors, Cotton was ranked 162nd overall amongst North American skaters by the NHL Central Scouting Bureau prior to the 2014 NHL Entry Draft. After going undrafted, he returned to the Warriors for the 2014-15 seson, recording 27 goals in 58 games.

Collegiate
Cotton spent his freshman season playing with the Northeastern Huskies men's ice hockey before withdrawing from the school after playing in eight games. He chose to forgo the remainder of his freshman year and played with the Youngstown Phantoms for the season. He returned to college for his sophomore year but was forced to redshirting for the 2016–17 season before joining the Sacred Heart Pioneers men's ice hockey team.

In his senior season, Cotton amassed a career-high 20 goals and 17 assists for 37 points and tied for fourth in point scoring in the conference. During the year, he also recorded three power play goals, three shorthanded goals, three game-winning goals and a hat-trick. As a result of his play, Cotton was a finalist for the Hobey Baker Award and selected for the Second Team All-American.

Professional
On March 24, 2020, Cotton concluded his collegiate career and was signed by the Carolina Hurricanes to an entry-level contract alongside his brother. His one-year, two-way contract was worth  $700,000 at the NHL level and $50,000 at the American Hockey League (AHL) level. When the AHL resumed play in 2021, Cotton and David were reassigned to the Chicago Wolves and eventually became the second set of brothers to play in the same game for the Wolves.

After just 1 game with the Wolves in the 2020–21 season, Cotton was re-assigned by the Hurricanes to the Fort Wayne Komets of the ECHL. He registered 4 goals and 6 points through 17 games before opting to conclude his professional hockey career, and mutually terminating his contract with the Hurricanes on April 7, 2021.

Career statistics

Regular season and playoffs

International

Awards and honors

References

External links
 

1995 births
Living people
Ice hockey people from Texas
American ice hockey centers
Chicago Wolves players
Fort Wayne Komets players
Northeastern Huskies men's ice hockey players
People from Parker, Texas
Sacred Heart Pioneers men's ice hockey players
Tri-City Storm players
West Kelowna Warriors players
Youngstown Phantoms players
AHCA Division I men's ice hockey All-Americans